Chaxiraxi is a goddess, known as the Sun Mother, in the religion of the aboriginal Guanche inhabitants of the Canary Islands. Chaxiraxi was one of the principal goddesses of the Guanche pantheon. She was associated with the star Canopus.

As natives of the Canary Islands are believed to have originally been pre-civilization Berbers, it is conjectured that Chaxiraxi may have been adapted from the Punic-Berber goddess Tanit, and given a different name and set of attributes. She is also associated by some with the alleged appearance c. 1392, 1400 or 1401 of the Virgin of Candelaria on Güímar, on the island of Tenerife, carrying her infant, Chijoraji.

Present-day worship 
Chaxiraxi is considered the main goddess of the neo-pagan religion the Church of the Guanche People.

References

External links 
 Guanche Religion
 Mundo Guanche: Chaxiraxi

Canopus
Guanche goddesses
African mythology
Berber goddesses
Mother goddesses